The Kingdom of Simien, sometimes referred to as the Kingdom of Beta Israel, refers to a probably legendary Jewish kingdom said to have been located in the northwestern part of the Ethiopian Empire. The existence of such a kingdom somewhere in the Horn of Africa was first mentioned by the traveller Benjamin of Tudela in the 12th century CE. 

A late Ethiopian-Jewish legend dates the establishment of a Kingdom of Simien to the 4th century CE, right after the Kingdom of Aksum turned to Christianity during the reign of Ezana. The existence of such a nation plays a significant role in the modern traditions of the Beta Israel.

Name
According to modern Beta Israel tradition, their forefathers land was called the "Kingdom of the Gideons", after the name of a putative dynasty of Jewish kings that are said to have ruled it. Eldad ha-Dani mentioned that the Tribe of Dan exiled voluntarily and established an independent kingdom. Between the 15th century and the early 17th century the Ethiopian Empire referred to the kingdom as "Falasha". Another name which was very common in the 16th and 17th centuries was the "Kingdom of Semien" – given to the kingdom after the area which it dominated after it lost control over the regions of Dembiya and Wegera.

History

Establishment 
An Israelite self-identity and Old Testament practices and culture have permeated Ethiopian civilization, and its Jewish and Christian populations, since very early times. 

The beginning of a conversion process of the Kingdom of Axum to Christianity is thought to have occurred with the arrival of two Syrian brothers Frumentius and Aedesius, sometime in the reign of Ezana. The conversion, bringing with it Hebraizing elements, was partial, initially was limited to the court and probably affected only the caravan trading route areas between Axum and Adulis. Neither Judaizing nor Christianizing local populations would have fitted into what we later define as normative Judaism or Christianity, but were syncretic mixtures of local faiths and new beliefs from forebears of these respective religions.  Later legend speaks of a revolt by Jews taking place at this period but there is no evidence that directly support this story, and its historicity is considered unlikely. A strong possibility exists that the Christian Kaleb of Axum, who had dispatched military contingents to fight against the Judaizing Dhu Nuwas of the Arabian peninsula kingdom of Himyar banished opponents to the Simien Mountains, which later emerged as a Beta Israel stronghold. Nothing in the historical record from the 6th to the 13th centuries, however, has allowed scholars to make anything more than very tentative hypotheses concerning the Jewish communities of that time. Legends surrounding a Jewish queen called Judith (Gudit) have been dismissed by Ethiopian specialists like Edward Ullendorff as without foundation in any historical facts.

The Golden Age of this putative Beta Israel kingdom would have taken place, according to the Ethiopian tradition, between the years 858–1270. The stories of Eldad ha-Dani spread the notion of just such an entity, though scholarly confidence in the veracity of many elements in his book is deeply divided: the majority of scholars dismiss its pretensions to conserve authentic history, but a small number consider that his narrative is the earlier to refer to the people much later known as Falasha. According to Steve Kaplan, neither Eldad nor Benjamin of Tudela -who hypothesized the existence of a Jewish polity there, - seem to have had any direct first-hand knowledge of Ethiopia. By the 16th century, David ben Solomon ibn Abi Zimra accepted the Jewishness of the Beta Israel but knew they were wholly unfamiliar with the Talmud.

Wars and collapse
In 1270 the Christian Solomonic dynasty was established and set out to consolidate its hegemony by subjugating the independent highlands. The drive towards religious and political unification took on momentum after Amda Seyon (1314-1344) came to power, and thereafter a succession of leaders campaigned in the north-west provinces of Simien, Wegera, Tselemt, Tsegede and Dembiya where the Judaized population were concentrated. .  There is no evidence for a unified Beta Israel dominion at this time. Judaized groups were dispersed, politically divided,- some being allied to the Emperor - and were referred to as "like Jews" (Ge'ez ከመ:አይሁድ kama ayhūd), or the "sons of Jews".

Emperor Yeshaq (1414–1429), who had allies among the Beta Israel, conquered Simien and Dambiya, whose governors were Jewish. Fiefs (gult) were distributed to secure loyalty and reward supporters, and Yesheq assigned such gult land to his allies. These owners  (bala-gult) could tax the peasants, who nonetheless in the Ethiopian tenure system still remained the hereditary proprietors. He introduced one innovation, however, regarding this hereditary property (rist). It could be retained by those willing to convert to Christianity and as a consequence, a portion of the Judaized community (ayhud) lost their land. Yeshaq decreed, "He who is baptized in the Christian religion may inherit the land of his father, otherwise let him be a Falāsī." This may have been the origin for the term "Falasha" (falāšā, "wanderer," or "landless person").

Between the years 1529 until 1543 the Adal Sultanate, with the assistance of forces from the Ottoman Empire, invaded the Ethiopian Empire. During that time period the Jews made a pact with the Ethiopian Empire. The leaders of the Kingdom of Beta Israel changed their alliances during the war and began supporting the Muslim Adal Sultanate. The Adal armies did not see much advantage in the Jewish kingdom's change of alliance and continued the fight against them, and later on conquered different regions of the Jewish Kingdom, severely damaged its economy and killed many of its members. As a result, the leaders of the Beta Israel kingdom turned to the Ethiopian empire and their allies the Portuguese, requesting their assistance in recovering the kingdom's regions. The forces of the Ethiopian empire eventually succeeded in conquering these regions and freeing Ethiopia, nevertheless, the Ethiopian empire decided to declare war against the Kingdom of Simien due to the Jewish leaders' change of position during the Ethiopian–Adal War. With the assistance of Portuguese forces from the Jesuit Order, the Abyssinian empire, under the rule of Emperor Gelawdewos, invaded the region and executed the Jewish king Hiram. As a result of this battle, the area of the realm became significantly smaller and now included only the region of the Simien Mountains.

In the 16th century, the Chief Rabbi of Egypt, Rabbi David ben Solomon ibn Abi Zimra (Radbaz) proclaimed that in terms of halakha (Jewish legal code), the Ethiopian community was certainly Jewish.

After the execution of king Hiram, King Radi became the leader of the Beta Israel kingdom. King Radi also rebelled against the Abyssinian Empire which at that period of time was ruled by Emperor Menas.

During the reign of emperor Sarsa Dengel the Jews rebelled  and got brutally suppressed by the Emperor who deployed cannons captured from the Ottomans. Most of the Jews who got besieged on a mountain fort committed suicide.

Legendary heads of a Gideonite dynasty
According to a Beta Israel legendary tradition the following list constitutes a dynasty of their ancestral kings. 

 Phineas – the first Beta Israel leader during the time period of emperor Ezana of Axum.
  Gideon IV – the father of Queen Judith.
 Queen Judith – (c. 960 – c. 1000) destroyed the Aksumite Empire.
  Gideon V – (1434–1468) said to have led a revolt against the emperor Zara Yaqob.
 Hiram –Beta Israel leader during the time period of emperor Gelawdewos of Ethiopia.
 King Radi – King of the Beta Israel after King Hiram during time period of emperor Menas of Ethiopia.
 King Caleb – King of the Beta Israel after King Radi during time period of emperor Sarsa Dengel of Ethiopia.
 King Goshen – King of the Beta Israel during time period of emperor Sarsa Dengel.
 King Gideon VII – King of the Beta Israel during time period of emperor Susenyos of Ethiopia.
 King Pinchas – King of the Beta Israel after Gideon VII.

See also
Beta Israel
Falash Mura
List of Jewish states and dynasties

References

Notes

Citations

Sources

 

Beta Israel
Former countries in Africa
History of Ethiopia
Jewish Ethiopian history
Jewish polities
States and territories disestablished in the 1620s
Tribe of Dan